The Sex Lives of College Girls is an American teen comedy-drama streaming television series created by Mindy Kaling and Justin Noble that premiered on HBO Max on November 18, 2021. In December 2021, the series was renewed for a second season, which premiered on November 17, 2022. In December 2022, the series was renewed for a third season.

Premise
The series follows the lives of four 18-year-old freshmen roommates at the fictional Essex College in Vermont, covering their sexually active lifestyle as they deal with the struggles and hardships of college and adulthood.

Cast and characters

Main

 Pauline Chalamet as Kimberly, a freshman who is a working student who comes from Gilbert, Arizona, a small town that is predominantly white, and comes from a poor family
 Amrit Kaur as Bela, an Indian-American student from Nutley, New Jersey, who wants to become a comedy writer and is sex-positive
 Reneé Rapp as Leighton, an affluent legacy student from New York City who is a lesbian and trying to live up to her mother's high expectations
 Alyah Chanelle Scott as Whitney, a star soccer player from Seattle who is having an affair with her assistant soccer coach and is the daughter of a U.S. senator
 Gavin Leatherwood as Nico (season 1), Leighton's older brother and Kimberly's love interest
 Christopher Meyer as Canaan, Kimberly's co-worker
 Ilia Isorelýs Paulino as Lila, Kimberly's co-worker
 Renika Williams as Willow, one of Whitney's teammates
 Lauren "Lolo" Spencer as Jocelyn, a student at Essex
 Midori Francis as Alicia (season 1; guest season 2), Leighton's love interest
 Mekki Leeper as Eric (season 2; recurring season 1), a writer for The Catullan
 Mitchell Slaggert as Jackson (season 2), a new student from Kansas who bonds with Kimberly

Recurring

 Rob Huebel as Henry, Leighton and Nico's father
 Gillian Vigman as Mimi, Leighton and Nico's mother
 Nicole Sullivan as Carol, Kimberly's mother
 James Morosini as Dalton (season 1), Whitney's assistant soccer coach
 Kavi Ramachandran Ladnier as Reena (season 1), Bela's mother
 Stephen Guarino as Roger, the Sips manager
 Jillian Armenante as Coach Woods (season 1), Whitney's head soccer coach
 Conor Donnally as Ryan (season 1), a writer for The Catullan
 Sierra Katow as Evangeline, a writer for The Catullan
 Maya Rose as Jena, Whitney's antagonistic teammate who later becomes her friend
 Sherri Shepherd as Evette, Whitney's mother and a U.S. senator from Washington
 Betti as Travis, a student who lives in the dorm
 Cheyenne Perez as Jo, a writer for The Catullan 
 Scott Lipman as Frude, the residence director of the dorm
 Isabella Roland as Carla, a fellow writer for The Catullan
 Amanda Ripley as Ginger
 Vico Ortiz as Tova
 Gedde Watanabe as Professor Harpin, Bela and Whitney's biochemistry teacher
 Donielle Nash as Jayla, a friend of Whitney's
 Aketra Sevillian as Zoe (season 2), an employee at Sips
 Charlie Hall as Andrew (season 2), Bela and Whitney's biochemistry classmate
 Gracie Dzienny as Tatum (season 2), Leighton's new love interest

Episodes

Series overview

Season 1 (2021)

Season 2 (2022)

Production

Development
The series was first announced at the HBO Max presentation in October 2019, under the working title College Girls. It was given a straight-to-series order of 13 half-hour episodes with Mindy Kaling announced to create, write and executive produce the series under her overall deal with Warner Bros. Television. In May 2020, the series was confirmed to be launching in 2021, under the new title The Sex Lives of College Girls. In October 2020, it was announced that the first episode would be co-written by Kaling and Never Have I Evers Justin Noble, with Noble joining the series as executive producer. On December 7, 2021, HBO Max renewed the series for a second season. On December 14, 2022, HBO Max renewed the series for a third season.

Casting
On October 14, 2020, the lead cast, made up of Pauline Chalamet, Amrit Kaur, Reneé Rapp and Alyah Chanelle Scott, was announced. Dylan Sprouse joined the main cast in December 2020, but was replaced by Gavin Leatherwood on March 12, 2021, who was cast alongside Midori Francis, Chris Meyer, Ilia Isorelýs Paulino, Lolo Spencer, and Renika Williams in starring roles. On May 19, 2021, Sherri Shepherd, Maya Rose, Rob Huebel, Nicole Sullivan, Conor Donnally, Sierra Katow, Mekki Leeper, and James Morosini joined the cast in recurring capacities. On August 16, 2021, Izzy Roland, Kavi Ladnier, Stephen Guarino, Matt Maloy, Donielle Nash, and Najee Muhammad joined the cast in recurring capacities. On June 3, 2022, Mitchell Slaggert was cast as a new series regular for the second season. On August 15, 2022, Charlie Hall joined the cast in an undisclosed capacity for the second season.

Filming
The series began filming on November 20, 2020, in Los Angeles. Filming also took place at Vassar College in mid-2021. On June 19, 2021, recurring cast member Sherri Shepherd posted a behind-the-scenes video of her character in costume and revealed that the series was scheduled to premiere in late 2021. Filming for the second season began in late April 2022, some of which took place on the University of Washington's Seattle campus.

Release
The Sex Lives of College Girls premiered on November 18, 2021, with the first two episodes available immediately, followed by three new episodes on November 25 and December 2, and the final two episodes of the first season on December 9 on HBO Max. The second season was released on November 17, 2022, with two episodes available immediately and two more episodes available weekly on Thursdays until the season finale on December 15.

From July 5, 2022, it is available on the RTÉ Player in the Republic of Ireland with some episodes airing on RTÉ2. The two seasons are available in the United Kingdom on ITVX. In Belgium the show can be watched via Streamz.

Reception

Critical response
For the first season, the review aggregator website Rotten Tomatoes reported a 97% approval rating with an average rating of 7.6/10, based on 30 critic reviews. The website's critics consensus reads, "While The Sex Lives of College Girls doesn't rewrite the syllabus for Anthropology 101, it succeeds gracefully as a warm-hearted romp on campus." Metacritic, which uses a weighted average, assigned a score of 72 out of 100 based on 17 critics, indicating "generally favorable reviews".

Saloni Gajjar of The A.V. Club gave the first season a B+ and wrote, "The way the show tackles how teens cope with sudden freedom is both funny and truthful." Angie Han of The Hollywood Reporter, said that it is "nothing novel or fancy [but] warm and gooey enough to satisfy."

On Rotten Tomatoes, the second season holds an approval rating of 92% with an average rating of 5.5/10, based on 12 critic reviews. The website's critics consensus states, "Bawdy and sweet as ever, The Sex Lives of College Girls continues to excel as a refreshing twist on youthful indiscretions." On Metacritic, it has received a score of 79 out of 100, based on 6 critics, indicating "generally favorable reviews".

Accolades
The Sex Lives of College Girls was nominated for the Outstanding New TV Series category for the 33rd GLAAD Media Awards in 2022. For its casting department (Elizabeth Barnes and Jennifer Euston), the series was nominated for an Artios Award for Outstanding Achievement in Comedy Pilot Casting. The series is set to be awarded the "Seal of Female Empowerment in Entertainment" (SOFEE) by the Women's Committee of the Critics Choice Association, for its outstanding work in "[illuminating] the female experience and perspective through authentically told female-driven stories."

References

External links
 
 

2020s American college television series
2020s American comedy-drama television series
2020s American LGBT-related comedy television series
2020s American LGBT-related drama television series
2020s American sex comedy television series
2020s American teen drama television series
2021 American television series debuts
English-language television shows
HBO Max original programming
Television series about teenagers
Television series by 3 Arts Entertainment
Television series by Warner Bros. Television Studios
Television series created by Mindy Kaling
Television shows filmed in Los Angeles
Television shows set in Vermont